Girraj is a given name. Notable people with the name include:

Girraj Dandotiya, Indian politician
Girraj Kishore Mahaur, Indian politician
Girraj Singh Dharmesh, Indian politician

Indian given names